3844 Lujiaxi, provisional designation , is a Henan asteroid from the central regions of the asteroid belt, approximately 15 kilometers in diameter. It was discovered on 30 January 1966, by astronomers at the Purple Mountain Observatory in Nanking, China. The asteroid was named after Chinese chemist Lu Jiaxi.

Orbit and classification 

Lujiaxi is a member of the Henan family, a large asteroid family in the intermediate main-belt, named after 2085 Henan. It orbits the Sun in the central asteroid belt at a distance of 2.4–3.0 AU once every 4 years and 6 months (1,649 days; semi-major axis of 2.73 AU). Its orbit has an eccentricity of 0.10 and an inclination of 4° with respect to the ecliptic.

Physical characteristics 

In the Bus–DeMeo and SMASS classification, Lujiaxi is an uncommon L-type asteroid, which is also the overall spectral type for members of the Henan family.

Rotation period and shape 

In August 2013, a rotational lightcurve of Lujiaxi was obtained from photometric observations by Italian amateur astronomer Silvano Casulli. Lightcurve analysis gave a rotation period of 10.415 hours (given as 0.43397 days) with a brightness amplitude of 0.43 magnitude.

In December 2014, a study by an international collaboration of astronomers found a period of 13.33 hours with an amplitude of 0.34 magnitude. The study selected Lujiaxi because it is a suspected "Barbarian" asteroid with a potentially slow rotation period. This group is named after 234 Barbara, which polarimetric properties and observed occultations suggest that such bodies have an unusual shape and topographic features with large concave areas.

Diameter and albedo 

According to the survey carried out by the NEOWISE mission of NASA's Wide-field Infrared Survey Explorer, Lujiaxi measures 13.74 and 15.538 kilometers in diameter and its surface has an albedo of 0.18 and 0.168, respectively.

The Collaborative Asteroid Lightcurve Link assumes a standard albedo for carbonaceous asteroids of 0.057 and consequently calculates a much larger diameter of 25.44 kilometers based on an absolute magnitude of 11.7.

Naming 

This minor planet was named after Lu Jiaxi (1915–2001), a Chinese physical chemist, who headed the Chinese Academy of Sciences and made important contributions to the structural chemistry of cluster compounds. The official naming citation was published by the Minor Planet Center on 11 February 1998.

References

External links 
 Asteroid Lightcurve Database (LCDB), query form (info )
 Dictionary of Minor Planet Names, Google books
 Asteroids and comets rotation curves, CdR – Observatoire de Genève, Raoul Behrend
 Discovery Circumstances: Numbered Minor Planets (1)-(5000) – Minor Planet Center
 
 

003844
003844
Named minor planets
003844
19660130